Ziraat Bankası SK is a Turkish volleyball club established in 1981 and based in Ankara, Turkey. It is sponsored by the state-owned Ziraat Bankası. Competing in the Turkish Men's Volleyball League, the top league in Turkey, its home venue is Başkent Volleyball Hall.

Honours

Domestic competitions 
 Turkish Volleyball League
 Winners (2): 2020–21, 2021–22
 Runners-up (2): 1995–96, 2009–10

 Turkish Volleyball Cup
 Winners (1): 2009–10
 Runners-up (3): 1989–90, 1990–91, 2008–09

 Turkish Volleyball Super Cup
 Winners (1): 2010

European competitions 
 CEV Cup
 Runners-up (1): 2017–18

 CEV Challenge Cup
 Runners-up (1): 2020–21

 Balkans Cup
 Winners (1): 2018

Team Roster
Team roster – season 2021/2022

External links 
 Official website

Ziraat Bankası S.K.
Volleyball clubs established in 1981
1981 establishments in Turkey